Cow Meadow, renamed Becket's Park in 1935, was an 18th-century county cricket venue situated alongside the River Nene near the centre of Northampton. It is known to have been used for two matches in August 1741. On Saturday, 15 August, a combined Northamptonshire & Huntingdonshire team played Bedfordshire and won. The second match on Tuesday, 18 August, was between Northamptonshire and Buckinghamshire and played for 20 guineas per side.

References

Bibliography
 
 
 

1741 establishments in England
Cricket grounds in Northamptonshire
Cricket in Northamptonshire
Defunct cricket grounds in England
Defunct sports venues in Northamptonshire
English cricket venues in the 18th century
Northamptonshire
History of Northamptonshire
Sport in Northamptonshire
Sports venues completed in 1741
Sports venues in Northamptonshire